Union of Iranian Republicans or United Republicans of Iran is a secular political organization founded in 2004 by Iranian leftist activists in exile. They are classified as part of the democratic republican opposition groups, whose members are not exclusively made up of former Marxists, but substantial numbers of them are.

In 2011, 'Organization of Iranian Republicans' split from this organization.

References

External links
Official Website

Banned political parties in Iran
Republicanism in Iran
Secularism in Iran
Political parties established in 2004
2004 establishments in Germany
Iranian organizations based in Germany
Republican parties